The Jiangxia Tidal Power Station (江厦潮汐电站) is the fourth largest tidal power station in the world, located in Wuyantou, Wenling City, Zhejiang Province, China. Although the proposed design for the facility was 3,000 kW, the current installed capacity is 3,200 kW, generated from one unit of 500 kW, one unit of 600 kW, and three units of 700 kW, totalling the installed capacity to 3,200 kW. Proposals were made to install a sixth 700 kW unit, but this has not yet been installed. The facility generates up to 6.5 GWh of power annually.

This facility also hosts a 40 kW solar PV power installation with an estimated 45,000 kWh annual production capacity. This system is composed of 216 pieces of 186 W monocrystalline solar modules manufactured by Perlight Solar.

The power station feeds the energy demand of small villages at a  distance, through a 35-kV transmission line.

Now it is a Major National Historical and Cultural Sites in Zhejiang, it is included on October 16, 2019.

The power generation rate of the site is technically loss-making, however the site is used to provide land reclamation to the area, a combination of aquaculture and shellfish farming provide income to make the scheme as a whole effective, and provide comprehensive use of the reservoir.

See also 

 List of largest power stations in the world
 List of power stations in China
 List of tidal power stations

References 

Energy infrastructure completed in 1980
Tidal power stations in China
Power stations in Zhejiang
Major National Historical and Cultural Sites in Zhejiang